K'ani (asomtavruli , nuskhuri , mkhedruli კ) is the 11th letter of the three Georgian scripts.

In the system of Georgian numerals it has a value of 20.

K'ani is a velar ejective consonant and is pronounced as hard Kani.

Letter

Stroke order

Computer encodings

Braille

See also
Kani (letter)

References

Bibliography
Mchedlidze, T. (1) The restored Georgian alphabet, Fulda, Germany, 2013
Mchedlidze, T. (2) The Georgian script; Dictionary and guide, Fulda, Germany, 2013
Machavariani, E. Georgian manuscripts, Tbilisi, 2011
The Unicode Standard, Version 6.3, (1) Georgian, 1991-2013
The Unicode Standard, Version 6.3, (2) Georgian Supplement, 1991-2013

Georgian letters